Aberdeen station is a train station in Aberdeen, Maryland, on the Northeast Corridor. It is served by Amtrak Northeast Regional intercity service and MARC Penn Line commuter service. The station has two side platforms serving the outer tracks of the three-track Northeast Corridor, with a station building on the north side of the tracks.

History

The station was originally built by the Philadelphia, Wilmington and Baltimore Railroad approximately in 1898, and inherited by the Philadelphia, Baltimore and Washington Railroad. The current station is a modern structure built in 1943 by Lester C. Tichy (1905–1981) for the Pennsylvania Railroad, It contains a 1960s-style pedestrian tunnel, with one of the entrances located at the former north station house. It also contains a pedestrian bridge built in 1982. Aberdeen was also served by an 1886-built Baltimore and Ohio Railroad station along what is now the CSX Philadelphia Subdivision just north of this one on West Bel Air Avenue. Prior to the mid-1980s there was a grade crossing located next to the station. It was removed after Amtrak completed the Northeast Corridor Improvement Project and replaced with an overpass.

References

External links

Amtrak stations in Maryland
Stations on the Northeast Corridor
MARC Train stations
Penn Line
Transportation buildings and structures in Harford County, Maryland
Aberdeen, Maryland
Railway stations in the United States opened in 1898
1898 establishments in Maryland
Former Pennsylvania Railroad stations